The Asian Institute of Technology (AIT), founded in 1959, is an international organization for higher education situated 40km north of Bangkok, Thailand. It specializes in engineering, advanced technologies, sustainable development, and management and planning. Its aim is to "promote technological change and sustainable development" in the Asia-Pacific region, through higher education, research, and outreach.

History
Founded in 1959 as SEATO Graduate School of Engineering, it receives funding from organizations and governments around the world.

In 1967, The Constituent Assembly of Thailand approved legislation for the Charter of the newly named Asian Institute of Technology in October. The Asian Institute of Technology Enabling Act was published in the Royal Thai Government Gazette in November the same year. AIT became independent of SEATO as an institution of higher learning empowered to grant degrees.

On 21 October 2011, AIT's campus was inundated by two-meter-high floodwaters. Since then, it has resumed operations at its campus.

AIT celebrated its 60th Anniversary on 23–25 October 2019. Her Royal Highness Princess Maha Chakri Sirindhorn who is the first royal alumna graciously presided over the celebrations on 24 October 2019.

In November 2019, AIT inaugurated the Belt & Road Research Centre.

Governance
AIT has been governed by a board of governors since its beginning. Traditionally a high-ranking Thai citizen has been the chairman of its board of trustees. At present the chairman of the AIT Board of Trustees is former Minister of Foreign Affairs of Thailand, Subin Pinkayan.

Ambassadors of 13 countries – Bangladesh, Cambodia, Canada, China, France, India, Indonesia, Korea, Lao PDR, Nepal, Pakistan, Sri Lanka, and Vietnam – are members of the AIT Board of Trustees. Ambassadors of two countries, Japan and Ambassador of EU have observer status in the AIT Board.

Ranking
In the 2021 Times Higher Education Impact Rankings (THE Impact Rankings), AIT ranks globally:
15th for SDG#1 No Poverty
58th for SDG#17 Partnerships for the Goals
64th for SDG#14 Life Below Water
67th for SDG#2 Zero Hunger
80th for SDG#15 Life on Land
100 - 200th for SDG#6 Clean Water and Sanitation
100 - 200th for SDG#11 Sustainable Cities and Communities
100 - 200th for Overall Impact

In the 2020 THE Impact Rankings, AIT ranks globally:
19th for SDG#1 No Poverty
86th for SDG#2 Zero Hunger
100 - 200th for SDG#6 Clean Water and Sanitation
100 - 200th for SDG#14 Life Below Water
100 - 200th for SDG#15 Life on Land
300 - 400th for Overall Impact

In 2020 QS Global MBA Rankings, AIT Master of Business Administration (MBA) program ranks 14th in Asia and 1st in Thailand. It also ranks 7th in Asia for Diversity and 18th in the world for Return on Investment.

In the QS World University Rankings by Subject 2020, AIT ranks 2nd in Thailand in Engineering and Technology, 151-200th in the world in Environmental Studies and in Architecture & Built Environment, and 201-250th in the world in Civil and Structural Engineering and in Agricultural and Forestry.

Location
Besides laboratories and academic buildings, the main campus includes housing, sports, and medical facilities, a conference center, and a library with over 230,000 volumes and 830 print and online periodicals.

AIT was hosted by the Faculty of Engineering, Chulalongkorn University, Thailand, before it moved to its present campus in November 1973. Currently it is located in Rangsit area next to Thammasat University (Rangsit Campus), about 65 kilometers from the Suvarnabhumi Airport.

AIT has a remote campus called AIT Center in Vietnam. It was established in 1993 under the memorandum of understanding between the Vietnam Ministry of Education and Training and the AIT. At that time AITCV was the first international institution in Vietnam and the first AIT campus outside Thailand.

Student body
AIT's student body comes from more than 50 countries, with Thailand contributing to about one-third. It has always been international, with international donors offering scholarships to AIT students for capacity building.

Scholarships
Full Scholarships
Royal Thai Government Scholarships
GMS Scholarships
Asian Development Bank - Japan Scholarship Program (ADB-JSP)
Japanese Government Scholarships for Doctoral Degree in Remote Sensing & Geographic Information Systems and Mechatronic Program
Japan Government scholarship for master's degree Program in Marine Plastic Abatement (MPA)
China Scholarship Council Government Scholarships
DAAD Scholarship
INDEX International Group Public Co., Ltd. Scholarships
BRIDGEX Scholarship for Structural Engineering
WE Consultant Scholarships
Joint Japan/World Bank Graduate Scholarship Program
ACIAR Scholarship for January 2021 Enrollment
and others.

Transition to intergovernmental organization status

Approval of new charter
In August 2010, a new "Charter of the Asian Institute of Technology (AIT)" was adopted and signed by the Ministry of Foreign Affairs of Thailand. Signatories to the new charter included Seychelles, Cambodia, Japan, Sri Lanka, Nepal, Pakistan, Sweden, Timor-Leste, Bangladesh, Philippines, India, and UNIFEM. The new charter came into force on 30 January 2012 as Sweden, Japan, India, Sri Lanka, Pakistan, Bangladesh, and Nepal deposited their instruments of ratification with the Ministry of Foreign Affairs of Thailand.

Difficulties and return to old charter
In 2012, Thailand declined to ratify the new charter, with the effect that the operations of AIT under the new intergovernmental charter resulted in the issuance of potentially invalid degrees. In December 2012, AIT opted to return to its previous national charter and ceased operating as an intergovernmental university. The degrees issued by AIT under the new charter were reissued under the old charter to avoid the risk of being unrecognized under Thai law. However, it seems that the "Charter of the Asian Institute of Technology (AIT)" remains legally in force without Thailand's participation and is in dormant status.

Listed among International Organizations by Thai Government
AIT is listed among international organizations by the Ministry of Foreign Affairs, Royal Thai Government.

Host to international organizations
The campus of Asian Institute of Technology is host to several international and non-governmental organizations including the Regional Resource Center in Asia and the Pacific (UNEP RRC.AP) (www.rrcap.unep.org), and the Regional Integrated Multi-Hazard Early Warning System for Africa and Asia (RIMES) (www.rimes.int).

It also hosts the global secretariat of the International Partnership for Expanding Waste Management Services of Local Authorities (IPLA), while the regional secretariat is hosted by UN HABITAT. Four UN agencies, three international donors and five national governments are part of IPLA.

AIT has collaborated with Nobel laureate Muhammad Yunus to create a Yunus Center at AIT with an objective "to contribute to poverty alleviation by enabling rural people to handle and be in control of improving their own livelihoods". The Yunus Center at AIT was launched on 8 September 2009. Likewise, AIT hosts Ostrom Center for Advanced Studies on Natural Resource Governance (OCeAN).

Academic programs
Asian Institute of Technology offers Master's,Doctoral, and Certificate courses. Among the programs offered include regular Master's and Doctoral programs, Flexible Degree options, One-Year Master's programs, Professional Master's programs, Unified International Bachelor-Master programs, Capacity-Building PhD Partnership programs, Erasmus Programs, Exchange Programs, Joint Degree Programs and Dual Degree programs.

School of Engineering and Technology (SET)
School of Engineering and Technology (SET) is the synergistic integration in November 2005 of the two former Schools, namely, the School of Civil Engineering (SCE) and the School of Advanced Technologies (SAT). Historically, the two schools came into existence only in January 1993 when the Institute reorganized the need to reform its academic structure from smaller-sized units called “Divisions” to larger bodies named “Schools”.

Since its inception, SET mission has been to develop highly qualified engineers and technologists who play leading roles in promoting the region's industrial competitiveness in its integration into the global economy.

School of Environment, Resources, and Development (SERD)
The School of Environment, Resources and Development (SERD) was established by amalgamating the four Divisions, namely: (1) Environmental Engineering Division (2) Human Settlements Development Division (3) Agriculture and Food Engineering Division and (4) Energy Division, in 1993. The name SERD was adopted after the EARTH Summit in Rio in 1992, emphasizing the important co-existence of environment and development.

SERD responds to regional needs by mobilizing and enhancing capacities for socially, economically, and environmentally sound development in partnership with public and private sectors. The School's interdisciplinary approach integrates technological, natural, and social sciences.

School of Management (SOM)
The School of Management was established in 1987 to meet the growing needs in Asia for graduate management education. The is to impact the quality of management education and practices in Asia-Pacific region, and around the world, to promote sustainable development, technological leadership, entrepreneurial spirit, wealth creation, and pride. Given its long history of creating both social and business impact, the school provides a unique competitive advantage to managers and future leaders in the region and around the world.

Students of SOM have the options of either studying at its dynamic campus located in the heart of Bangkok or on its beautiful self-contained international main campus located 40 km (25 miles) north of the city.

Inter-School Programs
Open Master of Engineering/Science in Interdisciplinary Studies (All Schools)
Disaster Preparedness, Mitigation and Management (SET & SERD)
Urban Water Engineering and Management (SET & SERD)
Social Business and Entrepreneurship (SERD & SOM)
Water Security and Global Change (SET & SERD)

Awards

Ramon Magsaysay Award
In 1989, AIT received a Ramon Magsaysay Award for Peace and International Understanding "for shaping a new generation of engineers and managers committed to Asia, in an atmosphere of academic excellence and regional camaraderie."

In 2009, an alumnus of AIT, Yu Xiaogang was also awarded the Ramon Magsaysay Award. The citation credited AIT and it said,

Friendship Order of Vietnam
The Government of Vietnam awarded the Friendship Order to AIT in 2006. It is the highest award given in the area of international relations and is presented to foreign institutions and persons that have contributed to human resource training for Vietnam, and to the development of friendly relations between Vietnam and other countries.

Other Awards
AIT received the Science and Technology for Development Award from USAID and National Research Council in 1987. In 1994, it won the Development Management Award from the Asian Management Awards, while in 1996, it was awarded by the Danube Adria Association and Manufacturing (DAAM) International Vienna, Austria. In 2016, AIT won the gold medal from the Thai Research Fund (TRF) for bagging the most perfect scores (seven scores of '5' each) among all universities in Thailand.

Facts and figures
1500+ students from 45+ countries
23,932 alumni from 100+ countries
38000+ short-term trainees from 100+
125 regular faculty from 20+ countries
420 research and support staff
1078 graduate courses
40+ academic programs
300+ ongoing research project

Sports
The AIT Grounds was host to World Women's T20 Tournament held in 2015 where eight countries played 10 matches. It is one of the three cricket fields in Thailand where Thailand's Premier League matches are played. The AIT Cricket Team has won the Bangkok Cricket League 'A' Division two times during the past three years.

It has a nine-hole golf course and a swimming pool. The campus offers facilities for badminton, takraw, table tennis, tennis, basketball, and volleyball.

Memberships
International Association of Universities (IAU)
Greater Mekong Sub-region Academic and Research Network (GMSARN)
 Association of Southeast Institutions of Higher Learning (ASAIHL)
Promotion of Sustainability in Postgraduate Education and Research (ProSPER.Net)
China Education Association for International Exchange (CEAIE)
Alliance of International Science Organizations (ANSO)

People

Students 
70% of the students come from outside of Thailand. As an institute that prides in its international orientation, students at AIT come from all over the world. In August 2018, it had 1800 students from 45 countries. The Institute admitted students from 25 countries from North America, Europe, Oceania, Asia and Africa. Asian students constitute the majority of the student body, with Southeast Asia (Thailand and Viet Nam) and South Asia (India, Nepal, Pakistan, Sri Lanka) usually contributing the majority of students

Presidents 
Prof. Kazuo Yamamoto is currently the interim president of AIT, succeeding Dr. Eden Y Woon on 1 September 2022. Previous presidents include Professor Milton E.  Bender Jr. (from USA), Professor Harold E. Hoelscher (from USA), Professor Robert B. Banks (from USA), Professor Alastair M. North (from Scotland), Professor Roger GH Downer (Ireland/Canada), Professor Jean-Louis Armand (from France), Professor Said Irandoust (from Sweden), and Professor Worsak Kanok-Nukulchai (from Thailand). Prior to the Institute becoming AIT, its predecessor, the SEATO Graduate School of Engineering had three Deans Professor Thomas H. Evans, Professor Robert Holcomb, Professor Milton E. Bender Jr. (who also became the first President of AIT), and Dr. Eden Y Woon.

Faculty 

AIT currently has 56 regular faculty members, with 27 in the School of Environment, Resources and Development; 30 in School of Engineering and Technology; and six in the School of Management.

In the School of Environment, Resources, and Development; ten faculty are working in Food, Agriculture & Bioresources, 12 in Development and Sustainability, and 15 in Energy, Environment and Climate Change.

In the School of Engineering and Technology, 14 work in Civil and Infrastructure Engineering, seven in Industrial Systems Engineering, and nine in Information and Communication Technologies.

The School of Management has six faculty members including the Dean.

Alumni 
Prominent alumni in Thailand include Dr. Prasarn Trairatvorakul, former Governor of Bank of Thailand; Gen. Boonsrang Niumpradit, former Thai Army Chief; Dr. Somchet Tinnapong, managing director of Dawei Development Company; Dr. Prasert Patramai, Chairman of Board of TEAM GROUP, Mr. Chaiwat Kovavisarach, President and chief executive officer of Bangchak Corporation,; Somprasong Boonyachai, Director, Intouch Holdings, and Vice Chairman of Board of Advanced Info Service; Sumate Tanthuwanit, CEO, Ngow Hock Group, TIPS Co Ltd. Thai Prosperity Terminal Co.,ltd., and Sintanachote Co.Ltd; Chaovalit Ekabut, Former President, SCG Investment and CFO Siam Cement Public Company Limited; Dr. Chainarong Na Lamphun, President and CEO, INDEX International Group; Preecha Ekkunagul, President and CEO of Central Pattana Public Company Limited; Vichai Bhucharoen, chairman, Board of Directors, GMS Corporation Ltd.; and Dr. Yanyong Phataralaoha, managing director, Thai Pipe Industry Company Limited;

International alumni include Mao Chi-kuo, Premier of Taiwan, Yu Xiaogang, winner of Ramon Magsaysay Award), Imtiaz Gilani, Provisional Minister of Education for the Government of Khyber Pakhtunkhwa;  Rafiul Ahad, Vice President, Software Development, Oracle Corporation; Huỳnh Ngọc Phiên, President, AMATA Group; Phạm Lê Thanh, chairman, EVM Vietnam Electricity, Boun Oum Syvanhpheng, CEO, Électricité du Laos; Nadeem Amjad, Member (National Resources) Pakistan Agricultural Research Council (PARC); Muhammad P Aftab, Vice President, National Engineering Services (NESPAK); MALWILA DISSANAYAKE, Malwila Dissanayake, chair, Environmental Science, Lakehead College, Canada; Wachchi Patabendege Ranjith Premalal De Silva; Vice Chancellor, Uva Wellassa University; Dr. Bindu Lohani, former Vice President of Asian Development Bank; and Dr. Tong Ki Woo, Governor of Education, Daegu Metropolitan City, Korea, and former president of Yeungnam University

Notable alumni

.th domain

DOT th Domain Name 
AIT administered .th, the country code top-level domain for Thailand until 2007 when the administration was transferred to the Thai Network Information Center Foundation.

References

Unified International Bachelor-Master Degree Program

External links 

Asian Institute of Technology
Celebrating AIT Alumni Success
AIT School of Management
AIT Center in Vietnam
AIT Alumni Association, Thailand Chapter
AIT videos on YouTube
AIT Alumni in Vietnam
Unified International Bachelor-Master Degree Program

 
Engineering universities and colleges in Thailand
Institutes of higher education in Thailand
Universities created by intergovernmental organizations
Educational institutions established in 1959
1959 establishments in Thailand
Ramon Magsaysay Award winners
Buildings and structures in Pathum Thani province